The 2019 Eden District Council election took place on 2 May 2019 to elect members of Eden District Council in England. The council went from Conservative control to No overall control This was on the same day as other local elections.

Results Summary

Results by Ward

Alston Moor

Appleby (Appleby)

Appleby (Bongate)

Askham

Brough

Crosby Ravensworth

Dacre

Eamont

Greystoke

Hartside

Hesket

Kirkby Stephen

Kirkby Thore

Kirkoswald

Langwathby

Lazonby

Long Marton

Morland

Orton with Tebay

Penrith Carleton

Penrith East

Penrith North

Penrith Pategill

Penrith South

Penrith West

Ravenstonedale

Shap

Skelton

Ullswater

Warcop

By-Elections

Penrith South

A by-election was held in Penrith South ward on 5 September 2019

Shap

A by-election was held in Shap ward on 14 November 2019

Hartside

A by-election was held in Hartside ward on 6 May 2021

Skelton

A by-election was held in Skelton ward on 6 May 2021

Penrith West

A by-election was held in Penrith West ward on 30 September 2021

References 

Eden District Council elections
Eden